Cyber Discovery was a United Kingdom initiative to get teenagers interested in cyber security. The initiative was funded £20 million by the UK Department for Digital, Culture, Media and Sport in partnership with SANS Institute Started in 2017, each year the program had followed a similar pattern of 4 (often overlapping) stages.

CyberStart Assess 
Each year of the program started with the Assess phase. It contained 14 capture-the-flag style challenges, and students who performed well were invited to progress to Game and Essentials.

CyberStart Game 
Game contained over 200 challenges, separated into 4 groups, known as 'bases'. The challenges had a similar format to the ones in Assess, but with a much broader scope and increased difficulty. As the student progressed through the levels, the challenges became much more difficult. A 'Field manual' was provided which contained instructions on how to use certain cybersecurity tools and techniques. Challenges were completed by finding a flag, which awarded a student with points equal to 100 times the level of the challenge. It was possible on most challenges to request a hint, which reduced the points gained from that challenge by half.

Headquarters 
By far the largest base with 156 challenges split into 13 levels of increasing difficulty, Headquarters covered a wide variety of challenges including open-source intelligence, cryptography, and binary and web exploitation.

Moon 
Exclusively taught programming in Python with a focus on using it to exploit files and web services. The Moon base consisted of eight levels, each with five challenges. The first three levels focused on tutorials, with the following five levels containing challenges to test a student's coding ability.

Forensics 
Added in year 2. The Forensics base focused on steganography and retrieving information from provided files such as packet captures, disk images and memory captures. This base consisted of 8 levels with 5 challenges each.

Volcano 
Added in year 3; the Volcano base provided pen-testing challenges and could only be unlocked after completing 100% of Headquarters. The base had 5 levels, each with 6 challenges. Unlike the other bases, challenges were individually sequentially unlocked, making it impossible to skip one. When a student unlocked Volcano access, challenges were completed within a Virtual machine hosted on the Cyber Start platform using VNC, with instances spun up on demand with everything necessary to complete the challenge. The same Virtual Machine was used for an entire level and access was only granted in 1 hour slots. This system was useful for students working on the programme at school where Virtual Machines and the tools required were often forbidden.

CyberStart Essentials 
Accessible by any students that qualified for Game, Essentials was a non-competitive learning environment containing video and text tutorials, quizzes and exams. It was designed to complement Game, and was usually open for much of the same time. In 2020, Essentials was updated to use the SANS Foundations course.

CyberStart Elite 
A small selection of the best-performing students in each of the preceding stages were invited to Elite events, which were face-to-face residential camps.

Year 1 
170 students attended 3 different events in Manchester, Bristol and London in Summer 2018. The events lasted for 2 days and included talks from industry professionals, challenges, and a Capture the Flag competition.

Year 2 
Events took place in Birmingham, Lancaster and London in Summer 2019. The older group (16-18 year olds) participated in courses ran by SANS Institute; either SEC504 or FOR500, while the younger group completed a course called Ethical Hacking Fundamentals.

Year 3 
Due to the COVID-19 pandemic, Year 3 Elite took place online. Older students (16-18s) were offered the choice of FOR500, SEC504, SEC560 or SEC503, delivered through SANS Live Online.

Year 4 
On 25 October 2020, all mentions of Elite were pulled from the initiative's website. However, 500 students were selected "based on a  combination of performance criteria from across Cyber Discovery" to take part in the Cyber Discovery Summer Event 2021. This was delivered virtually on 3 June and 5 June, and consisted of talks from industry experts and a Capture the Flag competition.

Content Creators Club 
The Content Creators Club was a Cyber Discovery initiative, separate from the other four rounds. Students submitted Capture the Flag challenge ideas, of which 50 were picked to then be developed for the first Creators CTF competition. A further 5 students then made walkthroughs with SANS CTO James Lyne, which were released on Vimeo.

References 

Computer security
Digital media